Penitentiary Point is a cliff in Wayne County, Utah, in the United States.

Penitentiary Point was probably so named because the striped rocks resemble jail stripes.

References

Landforms of Wayne County, Utah
Canyons and gorges of Utah